The flirtini is a cocktail containing vodka, champagne and pineapple juice. The flirtini is known for being seen on Sex and the City and The Mighty Boosh. In The Mighty Boosh, it contained a twist of lime, but no vodka.

A pink flirtini is made with cranberry juice and raspberries.

See also

 List of cocktails

References

External links 
 http://www.popsugar.com/food/Official-Flirtini-Recipe-From-Sex-City-1632139
 http://www.food.com/recipe/pink-flirtini-108631

Cocktails with vodka
Cocktails with Champagne
Three-ingredient cocktails
Cocktails with pineapple juice
Cocktails with cranberry juice
Bubbly cocktails